The House of Czartoryski (feminine form: Czartoryska, plural: Czartoryscy) is a Polish princely family of Lithuanian-Ruthenian origin, also known as the Familia. The family, which derived their kin from the Gediminids dynasty, by the mid-17th century had split into two branches, based in the Klevan Castle and the Korets Castle, respectively. They used the Czartoryski coat of arms and were a noble family of the Polish–Lithuanian Commonwealth in the 18th century.

The Czartoryski and the Potocki were the two most influential aristocratic families of the last decades of the Polish–Lithuanian Commonwealth (1569–1795).

History
The Czartoryski family is of Lithuanian descent from Ruthenia. Their ancestor, a grandson of Gediminas, the Grand Duke of Lithuania, became known with his baptismal name Constantine ( 1330−1390) - he became a Prince of Chortoryisk in Volhynia. One of his sons, Vasyli Chortoryiski (Ukrainian: Чарторийський;  1375–1416), was granted an estate in Volhynia in 1393, and his three sons John, Alexander and Michael (c. 1400–1489) are considered the progenitors of the family. The founding members were culturally  Ruthenian and  Eastern Orthodox; they converted to  Roman Catholicism and were Polonized during the 16th century.

Michael's descendant Prince Kazimierz Czartoryski (1674–1741), Duke of Klewan and Zukow (Klevan and Zhukiv), Castellan of Vilnius, reawakened Czartoryski royal ambitions at the end of the 17th century. He married  Isabella Morsztyn, daughter of the Grand Treasurer of Poland, and built  "The Familia" with their four children, Michał, August, Teodor and Konstancja. The family became known and powerful under the lead of brothers Michał Fryderyk Czartoryski and August Aleksander Czartoryski in the late Polish–Lithuanian Commonwealth of the 18th century, during the reigns Augustus II the Strong (King of Poland, 1697-1706 and 1709-1733) and Stanisław I Leszczyński (King of Poland 1704-1709 and 1733-1736). The Czartoryski had risen to power under August Aleksander Czartoryski (1697–1782) of the Klewa line, who married Zofia Denhoffowa, the only heir to the Sieniawski family.
 
The family attained the height of its influence from the mid-18th century in the court of King  Augustus III (. The Czartoryski brothers gained a very powerful ally in their brother-in-law,  Stanisław Poniatowski, whose son became the last king of the independent Polish-Lithuanian Commonwealth, Stanisław August Poniatowski.

The Czartoryski's Familia saw the decline of the Commonwealth and the rise of anarchy and joined the camp which was determined to press ahead with reforms; thus they sought the enactment of such constitutional reforms as the abolition of the liberum veto.

Although the Russian Empire confiscated the family estate at Puławy in 1794, during the third partition of Poland, the Familia continued to wield significant cultural and political influence for decades after, notably through the princes Adam Kazimierz (1734-1823), Adam Jerzy (1770-1861) and Konstanty Adam (1777-1866).

The Czartoryski family is renowned for the  Czartoryski Museum in Kraków and the Hôtel Lambert in Paris.

Today, the only descendants of Prince Adam Jerzy Czartoryski are Prince Adam Karol Czartoryski (1940- ) and his daughter Tamara Czartoryska (1978- ), who live in the United Kingdom. The descendants of Prince Konstanty Adam Czartoryski live to this day in Poland and have their representatives in the Confederation of the Polish Nobility.

Coat of arms and motto
The Czartoryski family used the Czartoryski coat of arms and the motto Bądź co bądź ("Come what may", literally 'let be, that which will be'). The family's arms were a modification of the Pogoń Litewska arms.

Notable members

Notable members include:

In Poland
 Wasyl Czartoryski (died after 1416), married Hanna
 Michał Czartoryski (died before 1486), married Maria Niemir
 Teodor Czartoryski (died 1542), married Princes Zofia Sanguszko h. Pogoń Litewska
 Iwan Czartoryski (died 1566), married Princess Anna Zasławska h. Korybut
 Jerzy Czartoryski (1550−1626), married Princess Aleksandra Wiśniowiecka h. Korybut, Halszka Hołowińska h. Hołowiński and Princess Zofia Lubomirska h. Szreniawa
 Michał Jerzy Czartoryski (1585−1661), married Princess Izabella Korecka h. Pogoń Litewska
 Michał Jerzy Czartoryski (1621−1692), married Rosine Margarethe von Eckenberg, Eufrozyna Stanisławska h. Szeliga and Joanna Weronika Olędzka h. Rawa
 Kazimierz Czartoryski (1674−1741), married Countess Izabela Elżbieta Morsztyn h. Leliwa
 Michał Fryderyk Czartoryski (1696–1775), married Countess Elenora Monika Waldstein
 August Aleksander Czartoryski (1697−1782) married Countess Maria Zofia Sieniawska h. Leliwa
 Adam Kazimierz Czartoryski (1734–1823), married Izabela Czartoryska h. Fleming
 Maria Anna Czartoryska (1768−1854), married Louis, Duke of Württemberg
 Adam Jerzy Czartoryski (1770–1861), married Princess Anna Zofia Sapieha h. Lis
 Izabella Elżbieta Czartoryska (1832–1899), married Count Jan Kanty Działyński h. Ogończyk
 Witold Czartoryski (1824–1865), married Maria Cycylia Grocholska h. Syrokomla
 Władysław Czartoryski (1828–1894), married María Amparo Muñoz, 1st Countess of Vista Alegre and Princess Marguerite Adélaïde of Orléans
 Beatified August Franciszek Czartoryski (1858–1893)
 Adam Ludwik Czartoryski (1872–1937), married Countess Maria Ludwika Krasińska h. Ślepowron
 Elżbieta Czartoryska (1905–1989) married Count Stefan Adam Zamoyski h. Jelita
 Augustyn Józef Czartoryski (1907–1946), married Princess Maria de los Dolores of Bourbon-Two Sicilies
 Adam Karol Czartoryski (b. 1940), married Nora Picciotto and Josette Calil
 Tamara Czartoryska (b. 1978)
 Konstanty Adam Czartoryski (1773–1860), married Princess Aniela Radziwiłł h. Trąby and Maria Dzierżanowska h. Gozdawa
 Jerzy Konstanty Czartoryski (1828–1912), married Maria Joanna Czermak
 Witold Leon Czartoryski (1864–1945), married Countess Jadwiga Dzieduszycka h. Sas
 Włodzimierz Alfons Czartoryski (1895–1975), married Countess Zofia Tyszkiewicz h. Leliwa
 Professor Paweł Czartoryski (1924–1999)
 Beatified Jan Franciszek Czartoryski (1897–1944)
 Roman Jacek Czartoryski (1898–1958), married Countess Teresa Janina Zamoyska h. Jelita
 Piotr Michał Czartoryski (1908–1993), married Countess Anna Zamoyska h. Jelita
 Zofia Czartoryska (1780−1873), married Count Stanisław Kostka Zamoyski h. Jelita
 Elżbieta Czartoryska (1736–1816), married Stanisław Lubomirski h. Szreniawa
 Konstancja Czartoryska (1700–1759), married Stanisław Poniatowski h. Ciołek, mother of the last King of Poland Stanisław August Poniatowski

In Hungary
 Piotr Czartoryski ( wife: Lázár Mária)
Mária Lázár (b. Mária Czartoriska) (1895-1983), actress ( mother: Lázár Mária)
 Serbán Ivánné (b. Magdolna Irén Czartoryska (mother: Lázár Mária)
 sons of Magdolna Iren Czartoryska
 Wachtel Elemér 
 Wachtel Domonkos 
 Dr Czartoryski Jenö (mother: Lázár Maria)
 sons of Jenö Czartoryski
 Adam Czartoryski born Budapest, Uppsala, Sweden
 Ivan Czartoryski born Budapest, Uppsala, Sweden, architect

Palaces

See also
 Czartoryska (disambiguation page for female members of the family)
 Princely Houses of Poland
 Familia
 Czartoryski Museum
 Royal Casket
 Czartoryski-Schlössel
 Hôtel Lambert
 Princes Czartoryski Foundation
List of titled noble families in the Kingdom of Hungary

References

External links
 
 Czartoryski at the Encyclopedia of Ukraine